His Last Haul is a 1928 American silent crime drama film directed by Marshall Neilan and starring Tom Moore, Seena Owen and Alan Roscoe. Under a woman's guidance, a criminal attempts to reform.

Cast
 Tom Moore as Joe Hammond 
 Seena Owen as Blanche 
 Charles Mason as Anthony Dugan 
 Alan Roscoe as Fly Cop 
 Henry Sedley as Blackmailer

References

Bibliography
 Munden, Kenneth White. The American Film Institute Catalog of Motion Pictures Produced in the United States, Part 1. University of California Press, 1997.

External links
 

1928 films
1928 crime drama films
1920s English-language films
American silent feature films
American crime drama films
Films directed by Marshall Neilan
American black-and-white films
Film Booking Offices of America films
1920s American films
Silent American drama films